Cultureshock was the Commonwealth Games cultural programme which ran alongside the Games themselves. The events ranged from images of the athlete as hero in sculpture and photography (Go! Freeze, which ran at Turton Tower in Bolton) to a Zulu performance at The Lowry. There was an exhibition at the Whitworth Art Gallery called Tales of Power: West African Textiles, and a performance of the film Monsoon Wedding at Clwyd Theatr Cymru. The geographical range was from Cheshire in the south to Blackburn and Cumbria in the north, and included that year the various Melas that take place around the region.

The full programme for Cultureshock is detailed below:

March 2002 
 1 March – 15 October – Commonwealth Gold, Rochdale Borough Festival 2002
 3 March – International Women's Day Festival, Manchester Town Hall
 4 March – Celebrate Commonwealth Gold Rochdale Town Hall
 9 March – Go Freeze, Turton Tower, Bolton
 10 March – Urban Grooves from the Commonwealth, Bridgewater Hall, Manchester
 11 March – Common-wealth, Manchester Metropolitan University
 11–16 March, English National Ballet – Romeo & Juliet, The Opera House Manchester
 12–13 March – 3 Shades, Bluecoat Arts Centre
 13–18 March – Tara Arts – Journey to the West:The Trilogy, Contact Theatre
 14 March – Trio Phoenix, Royal Northern College of Music
 14 March – Manchester Stories New Forms Vol 3, St Annes Church
 15 March – Rais Academy – Tales of the Past, Deeplish Community Centre
 17 March – Phil Bateman, More than Gold, Salvation Army Rochdale
 21 March – Trajets, Green Room, Manchester
 23 March – Tony Allen's Afro Beat, Band on the Wall, Manchester
 23 March – October – Tales of Power: West African Textiles, Whitworth Art Gallery
 24 March – Opera Rara – Elisabetta regina d'Inghilterra, Banqueting House, Whitehall
 27 March – The Mighty Zulu Nation – Africa Africa, The Lowry
 30 March – Srijani Quartet, Liverpool Philharmonic Hall
 March onwards – Textile Identities:Littoral Textiles, Manchester International Airport

April 2002 
 1 April – Easter Bank Holiday Market, Castlefield
 1 April – Burnley Blues Festival, Pinetop Perkins, Matt Schofield Band, Burnley Mechanics.
 3–30 April – Project by Suki Chan: Mondays was Washday, Turnpike Gallery
 6 April – Indian Association presents Cultural Journey Through Folk Dances of Bharat, Wythenshawe Forum Manchester
 7 April – Gear up for the Games Exhibition Salford Museum and Art Gallery
 8 April – Poetry in Motion, Wigan Library
 11 April – Hanif Kureishi's "My Beautiful Laundrette", Cornerhouse
 12–14 April – Festival of Bangladeshi Art & Culture, Bangladesh House
 13 April – "Storm", a new play by Lemn Sissay, Contact Theatre
 13 April – 27 October – "Moving Lives" exhibition at the People's History Museum
 15 April – Neil Ardley's "Kaleidoscope of Rainbows", Royal Northern College of Music
 22–27 April – "The Island" by Athol Fugard, John Kani and Winston Nishona, The Lowry
 25–27 April – Spirit of Youth in Music Festival, Rochdale
 25 April – Imagine Asia 2002 Film Festival, Liverpool Philharmonic Hall
 27 April – Music for the Mind and Soul, Liverpool Philharmonic Hall
 27 April – Iqbal Poetry Evening, Pakistani Community Centre Manchester
 27 April – Black Umfolosi, Burnley Mechanics
 28 April – Sam Yo!, The Lowry
 30 April – 2 May – Mira Nair's "Monsoon Wedding", Clwyd Theatr Cymru

May 2002 
 2 May – Tickle Bounce & Fun Time: Books for Babies, Tonge Moor Library, Bolton
 4 May – 30 June – Gateway to the Commonwealth exhibition, The Promenade, The Lowry
 9 May – Bradshaw and its Textile Industries, Harwood Library, Bolton
 9–11 May – Angela de Castro's "Yo Yo", Manchester Royal Exchange
 9–18 May – Kevin Gilbert's "The Cherry Pickers", performed by Sydney Theatre Company, Manchester Library Theatre
 10 May – 12 October – See It Live in Bolton Festival
 10–11 May – The Guide Association Lancashire Border presents "Songs and Dance of the Commonwealth"", Victoria Hall, Bolton
 11 May – 23 June – "Spectator Sport" exhibition, Cornerhouse
 21 May – Author Ruth Hamilton at the Lecture Theatre, Bolton
 16 May – Moniza Alvi reads "The Other Room", Manchester Central Library
 16–17 May – Compagnie Flak present "Perfume de Gardenias", Contact Theatre
 16 May – 22 June – Queer up North festival
 16 May – 28 July – "Reading the Games", programme of eventsin Manchester Libraries
 18 May – Trilok Gurtu and Nitin Sawhney, Contact Theatre
 19 May – 14 July – A Season of World Music at the Lowry
 21 May – Nitin Sawhney and MJ Cole, Barbirolli Room, Bridgewater Hall
 24–28 May – Linton Kwesi Johnson at Everyman Theatre Liverpool, Picture House Hebden Bridge and Manchester Library Theatre
 24 May – 1 June – Amani Naphtali's "Ragamuffin", Contact Theatre
 25 May – 17 July – "A Wealth in Common" exhibition, Bury Art Gallery and Museum
 26 May – Bolton Hindu Forum Community Festival, Bolton Indian Sports & Recreation Club, Darcy Lever
 26 May – Indoor League Pub Olympics, Cornerhouse Cafe Bar
 28 May – Mica Paris, Barbiroilli Room, Bridgewater Hall
 28 May – Central Band of the White Russian Army, Tameside Hippodrome
 28 May – Sibongile Khumalo, at the Lowry
 30 May – 8 June – Com.art.02 at Zion Arts Centre, Manchester
 31 May – Bolton Youth Concert Band Concert in celebration of the Queen's Golden Jubilee, Albert Halls, Bolton

June 2002 
 1 June – Streetlife, Bolton Town Centre
 8 June – 20 July – "Spotlight:Paintings by the Singh Twins, Mid Pennine Gallery, Burnley
 13 June – Bob Phillips book signing, Commonwealth Games Store, The Arndale Centre
 13 June – Creative Commonwealths: Cinema Culture & Community in the Age of Globalisation, The Cornerhouse
 14–30 June – An exhibition of the Postal History of the Commonwealth Games, Manchester Town Hall
 15–16 June – Aqua-Pura Commonwealth Trials, City of Manchester Stadium
 16 June – 3 August – Bolton's Festival of Cycling 2002
 17 June – Andrew Motion In Conversation, Manchester Central Library
 17–23 June – Literatures of the Commonwealth Festival
 18 June – 20 August – Visible Cities exhibition, Cube Art Gallery
 20 June – Jamaican poet Lorna Goodison, Manchester Central Library
 20 June – Gay Commonwealth Panel, discussion including novelist and critic Paul Bailey, New Zealand poet John Galtas, Scots poet David Kinloch, fiction writer Adam Mars-Jones, Canadian poet Norman Sacuta and Egyptian-born Ghanaian poet Gregory Woods, Manchester Central Library
 22 June – Design a T-shirt competition, Commonwealth Games Store Arndale
 22–27 June – Carnival Messiah, West Yorkshire Playhouse, Leeds
 22 June – 2 October – "Swim" – an exhibition about the Culture of Moving in Water – Turton Tower, Bolton
 23 June – Children's Workshop: Explore the Commonwealth, The Green Room
 25–29 June – David Hermanstein's "A Caribbrean Abroad", Manchester Library Theatre
 26 June – Prayer Network presents "Manchester: City of the Moment", The Lowry
 27 June – A Taste of New Zealand, Museum Gallery, Bolton
 28 June – 7 July – Commonwealth Film Festival
 29 June – One World Festival 2002, New Mills
 29 June – 21 July – Keyfest festival

July 2002 
 1–10 July – "Athletics Inspirations", Whitworth Park Manchester
 2 July – Opening of Touchstones Rochdale
 2–15 July – Mushaira Shakeup, Dynamic Poetry Showcase of South Asian Women poets (including Mansoora Ahmed, Gagan Gill, Parm Kaur and Shamshad Khan
 3 July – Joe Pemberton reads "Forever and Ever Amen", Manchester Central Library
 5 July – Cubanite at The Lowry
 6 July – Barracudas Carnival Band, Ulverston Carnival, Ulverston
 7 July – Working Woodlands Festival, Moses Gate Country Park, Farnworth
 7 July – Westhoughton Show, Central Park, Westhoughton
 8 July – Cauvery Madhavan, Levenshulme Library, Levenshulme
 9 July – 14 September – "Shikor a phool (Roots and Blossom), Gallery Oldham
 10 July – 13 September – Sri Lanka Crafty Thoughts, University of Liverpool Art Gallery
 11 July – John Kinsella, Manchester Central Library
 11 July – 14 September – Pakistan Threads Dreams and Desires, Harris Museum and Art Gallery, Preston
 13 July – Rochdale Mela
 13 July – recital by classic guitarist Neil Smith, St Katherines Church Horwich
 13 July – East Feast Fringe Festival, Corpus Christi Social Centre, Miles Platting
 13 July – Kakatsitsi:Master Drummers from Ghana, Chester Summer Music Festival
 13 July – Bolton Symphony Orchestra concert, The Albert Hall Bolton
 13 July – Youth Festival 2002, St Thomas's Park Stockport
 13–26 July – "Pulse", Bridgewater Hall
 13–28 July – Gloucester Summer Festival 2002
 13 July – 1 September – New Indian Art, Manchester Art Gallery
 13 July – 15 September – Conquer the Maize Maze, Redhouse Farm, Dunham Massey
 14 July – Abdullah Ibrahim and the NDR Big Band, Bridgewater Hall
 14 July – Rebecca Malope at the Lowry
 15 July – Anoushka Shankar on the sitar, Bridgewater Hall
 15–20 July – Commonwealth Bridge Championships, Whitworth Hall, Manchester University
 16 July – 14 September – Bollywood greats, Blackburn Museum & Art Gallery
 17 July – Evelyn Glennie and the Halle Orchestra, Bridgewater Hall
 17 July – Stella Osammor presents African Fables for Children, Manchester Central Library
 18 July – "Are You Waltzing? Matilda", Leigh Library
 19 July – North West Steel Band Association Festival 2002, Zion Arts Centre, Hulme
 19–22 July – 12th Commonwealth International Sport Conference, Manchester Metropolitan University
 19 July – 3 August – Duke of Edinburgh's Award International Youth Exchange with Swaziland
 20 July – Spirit-International Festival of Music & Arts, Cannon Hill Park, Birmingham
 20 July – A Common Wealth of Music, Birch Community Centre, Rusholme
 20–21 July – Aquafest Commonwealth Angling Competition, Ashton and Rochdale Canals, Sport City
 21 July – Abasindi and the National Dance Company of Ghana, RHS Flower Show, Tatton Park
 21 July – Variety 2002 An Overture for the Commonwealth, The Lowry (inclucing Diane Modahl, Zingari Swing and The Sixties Tiller Girls
 21 July – Together as One, Chester Tree Festival, Alexandra Park, Chester
 21 July – 3 August – Bolton Town Centre Heritage Tours
 21 July – 5 August – Commonwealth Games Special Guided Tours, Manchester
 22–26 July – Traditional Chinese Art Exhibition, Central Hall Manchester
 22–28 July – C-C- 2002, Heywood
 23–24 July – Loud & Visible, Youth Arts..shock!, Zion Arts Centre, Hulme
 24 July – Michael Nyman meets Indian Masters in Sangam, The Lowry
 24 July – 10 August – Noël Coward's "Design for Living", Royal Exchange Theatre
 25 July – Euforia 2002, Pierhead Liverpool
 25–28 July – Catch the Spirit of the Games at BUPA's Mind Body and Soul zone at Cathedral Gardens
 25 July – 4 August – Festival Live, various venues around Manchester City Centre
 26 July – Spirit of Friendship Royal Gala Concert, featuring Kiri te Kanawa, Bridgewater Hall
 26 July – 23 August – Chinwe – An Exhibition for the Commonwealth Games, Manchester Central Library
 27 July – Oldham Mela
 27 July – Kevin Davy's Commonwealth Jam, Band on the Wall
 27–28 July – Littleborough Rushbearing
 28 July – Bolton Mela Festival
 28 July – Asian Literature & Arts Festival, Longsight Library, Manchester
 28 July – Songs of Praise for the Commonwealth Games, St Ann's Church, Manchester
 28 July – Songs from the Commonwealth by Renaissance, Bramall Hall, Stockport
 28 July – Nelson Mela
 28 July – Local & International Bands at Manchester Hard Rock Cafe
 29 July – Catch the Spirit of the Games at BUPA's Mind Body and Soul zone at Asda Eastlands
 29 July – "Going for Gold: A Spiritual Approach to Achieving Goals" with Lesley Gort, Christian Science Reading Room
 29 July – Commonwealth Games show, Frog & Bucket Comedy Club
 29 July – 2 August – Commonwealth Cafe, King's House
 30 July – Special Sportsmans Dinner Meeting with USA Boxer Earnie Shavers, Swinton Park Golf Club
 31 July – "Games Structures", photographs by Stephen M Smith, Simple Cafe Bar

August 2002 and later 
 1 August – Tony Kofi and his Afro-Jazz family, Band on the Wall
 2 August – Nucleus Roots, Band on the Wall
 2 August – Special Sportsmans Dinner Meeting, with footballer Martin Clarke, Swinton Park Golf Club
 2 August – A Classical Evening in an Urban Park, Royal Liverpool Philharmonic Orchestra, Longford Park
 3 August – "G Percussion", Commonwealth Games Percussion, Castlefield
 3 August – City Centre Secrets, Victorian Society guided-walk around Manchester City Centre
 3 August – More than Gold Final Festival, Salvation Army Hall Rochdale
 3–5 August – Flower Festival, Horwich Moor Methodist Church
 4 August – Hyndburn Mela
 4 August – Preston Mela
 4 August – Mujo, the Big Band Sound for the Big Games Finale, Manchester Hard Rock Cafe
 11 August – Rock in the Park, Queen's Park Heywood
 11 August – East Feast Festival – Fire & Water Festival, Ashton Canal, Philips Park
 11 August – The Comedy Store's Post Commonwealth Cabaret
 11 August – Commonwealth Black Pudding Throwing Championships, Ramsbottom
 12 August – 26 November – "Spirit of the Games", Manchester Museum of Science and Industry
 16–18 August – Bolton Show, Leverhulme Park, Bolton
 26–30 August – Commonwealth Tenpin Bowling Championships, Stirling
 9 October – 9 November – "Swim" – an exhibition about the Culture of Moving in Water – Lancaster City Museum

2002 Commonwealth Games